Koruk (also Romanized as Korūk, Korūk, and Körook; also known as Garūk and Kurūk) is a village in Rud Ab-e Gharbi Rural District, Rud Ab District, Narmashir County, Kerman Province, Iran. At the 2006 census, its population was 1,046, in 279 families.

References 

Populated places in Narmashir County